is the fifth single by Japanese music trio Candies. Written by Kazuya Senke and Yūsuke Hoguchi, the single was released on September 1, 1973. It was the first single to feature Ran Itō as the main vocalist.

The song peaked at No. 9 on Oricon's singles chart and sold over 260,000 copies, making it the trio's first top-10 hit. The group made their Kōhaku Uta Gassen debut with this song, at the 26th event.

Track listing
All lyrics are written by Kazuya Senke; all music is written and arranged by Yūsuke Hoguchi.

Chart positions

Star Flower version 

The duo , made up of child actresses Kanon Tani and Seiran Kobayashi, covered the song in August 2012. It peaked at No. 62 on Oricon's singled chart.

Track listing

Chart positions

Super Girls version 

Japanese idol group Super Girls (credited as ) released their version of "Toshishita no Otokonoko" on December 4, 2013. The single peaked at No. 11 on Oricon's singles chart.

Track listing

Chart positions

Other cover versions 
 The Nolans covered the song in English as "Toy Boy" on their 1991 cover album Tidal Wave (Samishii Nettaigyo).
 Speena covered the song as a B-side of her 2005 single "Material Girl".
 Janet Kay covered the song in English on her 2012 cover album Idol Kay.
 C@n-dols covered the song in 2013.
 J-pop group Goose House covered this song in 2014 on their YouTube channel.
 Mone Kamishiraishi covered the song on her 2021 cover album Ano Uta.

References

External links 
Candies
 

Star Flower
 

Super Girls
 

1975 singles
1975 songs
2012 debut singles
2013 singles
Japanese-language songs
Candies (group) songs
Sony Music Entertainment Japan singles
Victor Entertainment singles